Mt. Pisgah Baptist Church is a historic Baptist church building at 310 Green in Orangeburg in Orangeburg County, South Carolina.  It was built in 1903, and is a one-story, brick Romanesque Revival-style church building.  It features a prominent corner tower.

It was added to the National Register of Historic Places in 1985.

References

Churches completed in 1903
20th-century Baptist churches in the United States
Baptist churches in South Carolina
Churches on the National Register of Historic Places in South Carolina
Churches in Orangeburg County, South Carolina
African-American history of South Carolina
National Register of Historic Places in Orangeburg County, South Carolina